Christine Joy Moffatt, CBE, FRCN is a British nurse and educator.

Biography
Following training at Charing Cross Hospital, Moffatt trained as a district nurse. Following a diploma in leg ulcer care she became involved in research, became a lecturer at Imperial College London. She ran the Centre for Research and Implementation of Clinical Practice independently before entering into an association with Thames Valley University. 

Professor Moffatt was created a Commander of the Order of the British Empire in the 2006 New Year's Honours list by Queen Elizabeth II and was made a Fellow of the Royal College of Nursing in the same year.

She is Chair of the International Lymphoedema Framework and a founder member/director of the Centre for Research and Implementation of Clinical Practice The centre has a large clinical research programme including running multi-centre trials. She is involved in assisting organisations in developing and evaluating new services. Current research projects include epidemiology of lymphoedema, evaluation of leg ulcer treatments and the development of quality of life measures for patient outcome.

Professor Moffatt is an Emeritus Professor at Nottingham University where she was Professor of Clinical Nursing Research and a nurse consultant at Nottingham University Hospitals. Recognising the need for a national body to represent professionals treating patients with leg ulceration, she launched the "Leg Ulcer Forum", of which she is president. She was president of the European Wound Management Association Council, an organisation responsible for facilitating research, education and practice in European countries from November 1999 until May 2002. She has also had four nursing textbooks published.

She is a patron of The Leg Club.
She holds visiting chairs at: University of Glasgow; Cardiff University Medical School Wound Healing Institute; Kanazawa University, Japan, Western Ontario University, Canada and LOROS Hospice UK.

References

Living people
Nurses from London
British educational theorists
Commanders of the Order of the British Empire
Academics of the University of West London
Academics of Imperial College London
Year of birth missing (living people)
Place of birth missing (living people)
Fellows of the Royal College of Nursing
British nurses